Hostýn-Vsetín Mountains is a mountain range in the Zlín Region of the Czech Republic.

The mountains are densely forested mainly by secondary spruce plantations. Most visited are the bordering Rožnovská Bečva river valley in the north (with Valašské Meziříčí and Rožnov pod Radhoštěm towns and Dolní, Prostřední and Horní (i.e. Lower, Middle and Upper) Bečva resorts) and the southern Vsetínská Bečva river valley starting in the town of Vsetín with the resort of Velké Karlovice.

The Hostýn-Vsetín Mountains are part of the Western Carpathians, it is divided by the Bečva River valley into the lower eastern Hostýnské vrchy and the higher western Vsetínské vrchy which are a part of the Beskydy Landscape Protected Area. They are built mainly of flysch deposits and their high sediments in both Bečva rivers valleys. The flysch slopes are rather unstable and thus small landslides are typical for this area. The highest point is Vysoká (i.e.

References

Resources
 
 

Mountain ranges of the Czech Republic
Mountain ranges of the Western Carpathians
Geography of the Moravian-Silesian Region
Highlands